SS City of Bradford was a British passenger and cargo steamship that was built in Yorkshire in 1903, renamed Donau in 1916, reverted to City of Bradford in 1919 and became Hanne in 1936.

In the First World War the Imperial German Navy captured her and used her as an auxiliary ship. In the Second World War she was sunk by an air attack in the Mediterranean in 1942.

Building
In 1903 Earle's Shipbuilding and Engineering of Hull, Yorkshire built a pair of ferries for the Great Central Railway. City of Leeds was launched on 8 June 1903. Jane Robinson, wife of the Great Central's chief mechanical engineer John G. Robinson, launched City of Leeds sister ship City of Bradford on 23 July.

She was registered at Grimsby. Her UK official number was 118913 and her code letters were VFRM.

GCR and LNER career
City of Leeds and City of Bradford ran scheduled services between Grimsby and Hamburg.

When the First World War began at the end of July 1914, City of Leeds was caught unawares. The German Navy captured her off Heligoland and took her to Hamburg as a prize. She was converted into a naval repair ship, then a tender ship and finally an escort ship. By 1916 she had been renamed Donau. In 1919 she was returned to Grimsby and her name was reverted to City of Bradford.

In the same year the Great Central became part of the new London and North Eastern Railway (LNER), and City of Bradford became part of its fleet.

By 1930 City of Bradford was equipped for wireless telegraphy and her navigation equipment included submarine signalling. In 1934 the call sign MCXZ superseded her code letters. From 1935 Associated Humber Lines managed her.

Near East Shipping Company
In 1936 the LNER sold City of Bradford to the Near East Shipping Co, which was managed from Haifa in Palestine. Her new owner renamed the ship Hanne and registered her in London.

In the Second World War Hanne was in the Mediterranean. In November 1940 she was part of Convoy AS 5 from Piraeus to Port Said. In February 1942 she was part of Convoy AT 29 from Alexandria to Tobruk.

Convoy AT 29 comprised only three merchant ships: the Palestinian Alisa, Danish Bintang, and Hanne. It had no naval escort. The three ships left Alexandria on 20 February 1942. Two days later German aircraft attacked the convoy, sinking Hanne off the coast of Egypt and Bintang off the coast of Libya. Four members of Hannes crew and 19 members of Bintangs crew were killed.

References

Bibliography

1903 ships
Maritime incidents in February 1942
Passenger ships of the United Kingdom
Ships of Associated Humber Lines
Ships of the Great Central Railway
Ships built in Kingston upon Hull
Ships of the London and North Eastern Railway
Ships sunk by German aircraft
Shipwrecks of Egypt
Steamships of Germany
Steamships of the United Kingdom
World War I auxiliary ships of Germany
World War II merchant ships of the United Kingdom
World War II shipwrecks in the Mediterranean Sea
Cargo ships sunk by aircraft